KVHS (90.5 FM, "90.5 The Edge") is a non-profit high school radio station playing an active rock music format. It is licensed to Clayton Valley High School under the jurisdiction of the Mount Diablo Unified School District and broadcasts from the campus of Clayton Valley Charter High School, Concord, California. The signal reaches the counties of Contra Costa, Solano, Napa, San Joaquin, West Sacramento and Yolo, and KVHS primarily serves the Diablo Valley area.

History

KVHS went on the air as an AM station in 1966...on 850 (Eagles 85)....then moved to 880AM...and later, 660 AM as a carrier current operation. The first faculty advisor was James Copeland...then Ernie Spencer and Ernie Wilson.  By that time KVHS was nothing more than a PA system that was literally wired to all of the classrooms as well as carrier current to the office for PA broadcasting to the campus quad for the rock and roll "noon show."  At that time, Al Taddeo was "Count Clayton."  The station was closely affiliated with the old K-KIS 990 AM rocker for music, production supplies and publicity.

In 1969, KVHS was granted an FCC license to broadcast on 91.1 FM. In the years that followed, the station moved to its present frequency of 90.5, the music formats have changed from block programming and public affairs to Contemporary and Rock, to Hard Rock, to Alternative to its current format of Active Rock.

High school and adult students from all over Contra Costa County have always made up the staff of KVHS. The Faculty Advisor for 20 years was Tom Wilson, who has been involved in the radio industry since 1970. After starting out as a call-in guest on KSFO he moved on to KWUN, and also on to KQED-TV. He was also an on-air personality and the Operations Director at KWUN before becoming the Faculty Advisor at KVHS in 1978.

In 1998, Melissa Wilson (a.k.a. Melissa McConnell of San Francisco Bay Area radio and television) took over as General Manager and Faculty Advisor of KVHS-FM. Melissa was an on-air personality and programmer for such radio stations as KYA-FM and AM, K101-FM, KEEN-AM, KDBK/KDBQ-FM ("Double 99FM"), KKIS-FM and AM, KYCY-FM, KATM-FM, as well as KWUN-AM with Tom Wilson. She transitioned KVHS from signing off the air at 10pm to 24/7/365 operation with the installation of digital automation in 1998, which is responsible for the uninterrupted on-air programming (when there is no live DJ) to date.

In 2013, budget cuts were responsible for the layoff of the Faculty Advisor and the closing of the class. The decision to either move the station to another location or hire a new Faculty Advisor to restart the KVHS Radio Communications class is currently under consideration by the MDUSD School Board. Although not affiliated with the Clayton Valley Charter High School, the studios are currently still located on the campus of CVCHS, and the ownership and oversight of the radio station remains by the Mount Diablo School District (also the owner of the CVHS campus.)

References

External links
Official website

High school radio stations in the United States
VHS